Micropterix lakoniensis is a species of moth belonging to the family Micropterigidae and is an endemic species from Greece. The first specimens were collected from Monemvasia, Greece by G Christensen, M Horak and B Skule, and described by John Heath in 1985. The holotype male is held in the UZM Copenhagen.

References

External links
  Species info

Micropterigidae
Moths described in 1985
Moths of Europe
Endemic fauna of Greece